Westmont may refer to:

Places
 Westmont, California
 Westmont, Illinois
 Westmont, New Jersey
 Westmont, Pennsylvania
 Westmont Historic District

Schools
 Westmont College, a private interdenominational Christian liberal arts college in Santa Barbara, California, USA
 Westmont Community Unit School District 201, Westmont, Illinois, USA; school district
 Westmont High School (disambiguation)

See also
 Westmont station (disambiguation)
 Mount West, Antarctica
 Mountain west (disambiguation)
 West Mountain (disambiguation)
 Westmount (disambiguation)